Ilex quercetorum is a species of plant in the family Aquifoliaceae. It is found in Guatemala and Mexico. It is threatened by habitat loss.

Description
Ilex quercetorum is tree which grows from 6 to 15 meters tall, with a trunk up to 25 cm in diameter.

Range and habitat
Ilex quercetorum is native to the southern Mexico, Guatemala, and Honduras. In Mexico it lives in the Sierra Madre de Oaxaca Veracruz and Oaxaca states and in the Chiapas Highlands and Sierra Madre de Chiapas of Chiapas, and in the highlands of Guatemala and Honduras.

It inhabits cloud forests and humid oak and pine forests from 200 to 2,500 meters elevation.

References

quercetorum
Vulnerable plants
Trees of Guatemala
Trees of Mexico
Flora of the Sierra Madre de Oaxaca
Sierra Madre de Chiapas
Flora of the Chiapas Highlands
Cloud forest flora of Mexico
Taxonomy articles created by Polbot